L 98-59 b is an exoplanet having a size between that of the Earth and Mars and a mass only half that of Venus. It orbits L 98-59, a red dwarf 35 light-years away in the constellation Volans. There are at least 3 (possibly 4) other planets in the system: L 98-59 c,  d,  e, and the unconfirmed L 98-59 f. Its discovery was announced on 27 June 2019 on the NASA website. It was the smallest planet discovered by TESS until the discovery of LHS 1678b, and was the lowest-mass planet whose mass has been measured using radial velocities until Proxima Centauri d was found in 2022.

Characteristics 
L 98-59 b orbits in 2.25 days and stays so close to the star that it receives 22 times more energy than Earth receives from the Sun. There are 4 confirmed planets in the system but they are not in the habitable zone of the host star. The temperature of the planet detected by TESS is 330 °C. In 2022, transmission spectroscopy has indicated that the planet has either no atmosphere or opaque atmosphere with the high-altitude hazes.

References 

 

Exoplanets discovered in 2019
Exoplanets discovered by TESS
Transiting exoplanets